Magrill is a surname. Notable people with the surname include:

George Magrill (1900–1952), American actor
Rose Marie Magrill (1924–2016), American model

See also
Magill (surname)